Bab Moulay Ismaïl (Arabic: باب مولاي إسماعيل) is one of the city gates of Meknes, Morocco. It dates back to the 17th century and was named after Moulay Ismail.

See also
Moroccan architecture

References

External links
Image of Bab Moulay Ismail: https://www.alamy.com/stock-photo/bab-moulay-ismail.html

Buildings and structures in Meknes
Gates of Meknes